Matthew James Lamb  (born 19 July 1996) is an English cricketer. He made his first-class debut for Warwickshire on 6 September 2016 in the 2016 County Championship. He made his List A debut for Warwickshire in the 2017 Royal London One-Day Cup on 5 May 2017. He made his Twenty20 debut on 11 August 2019, for Warwickshire in the 2019 t20 Blast.

References

External links
 
 
 Matt Lamb at Warwickshire County Cricket Club

1996 births
Living people
English cricketers
Warwickshire cricketers
Cricketers from Wolverhampton